The 2022 Arab League summit, officially the 31st Ordinary Session of the Council of the League of Arab States at the Summit Level, was held at its 31st session in Algiers. This was the fourth time the city hosted this event. All Arab countries were represented at the event, with the exception of Syria, which has been suspended since 2011 due to the ongoing crisis. The summit was postponed several times before its date was confirmed on 1 November 2022. It was initially to be held in 2020, 2021 and finally March 2022. But due to the COVID-19 pandemic, it was postponed to November to coincide with the anniversary of the outbreak of the Algerian Revolution. The summit was also the first since a number of countries normalized relations with Israel, causing a schism in the Arab position, which had remained united over what was stipulated in the Beirut 2002 initiative.

The King of Saudi Arabia, the Crown Prince of Saudi Arabia, the Emir of Kuwait, the King of Bahrain, the Lebanese President ,and the Sultan of Oman did not attend the summit.

Participation 

  – Secretary-General Ahmed Aboul Gheit
  – President Abdelmadjid Tebboune (host)
  – Special Representative of the King, Mohammed bin Mubarak Al Khalifa
  – President Azali Assoumani
  – President Ismaïl Omar Guelleh
  – President Abdel Fattah el-Sisi
  – President Abdul Latif Rashid
  – Crown Prince Hussein bin Abdullah
  – Crown Prince Mishal Al-Ahmad Al-Jaber Al-Sabah
  – Prime Minister Najib Mikati
  – Chairman of the Presidential Council Mohamed al-Menfi
  – Foreign Minister Nasser Bourita
  – President Mohamed Ould Ghazouani
  – Deputy Prime Minister Asa'ad bin Tariq
  – President Mahmoud Abbas
  – Emir Tamim bin Hamad Al Thani
  – Foreign Minister Faisal bin Farhan Al Saud
  – President Hassan Sheikh Mohamud
  – Chairman Abdel Fattah al-Burhan
  – President Kais Saied
  – Prime Minister Mohammed bin Rashid Al Maktoum
  – Chairman of the Presidential Leadership Council Rashad al-Alimi

Guests
  – Secretary-General António Guterres
  – Chairperson Macky Sall
 Speaker of the Arab Parliament Adel Al Asoomi
  – Secretary General Hissein Brahim Taha
 Non-Aligned Movement – Secretary General Ilham Aliyev

Syria 
There was a wide discussion about the possibility of Syria attending the summit, but due to the refusal of some influential countries in the League, this will not happen. Algeria was among the countries that demanded the invitation of Damascus.

Agenda 
 The Palestinian cause
 The crises in Syria, Libya and Yemen
 The Russo-Ukrainian war and its aftermath
 Terrorism and its impact on the region
 Arab food security
 Energy crisis
 Turkish and Iranian interference
 Arab League reform

Outcomes 
The leaders concurred in the final declaration to support Palestine's application for full membership in the UN and to welcome the announcement of reconciliation made by the Palestinian factions in mid-October. The summit placed a strong emphasis on enhancing cooperative Arab action to safeguard Arab national security in all areas and help some Arab nations out of their crises while maintaining their sovereignty, territorial integrity, and unity while also satisfying their populations' needs for a decent standard of living.

Gallery

References

2022 conferences
2022 in international relations
2022 in Algeria
November 2022 events in Africa
2022
Events affected by the COVID-19 pandemic